Calvin Moore (born 30 June 1869, date of death unknown) was a Guyanese cricketer. He played in three first-class matches for British Guiana in 1894/95 and 1895/96.

See also
 List of Guyanese representative cricketers

References

External links
 

1869 births
Year of death missing
Guyanese cricketers
Guyana cricketers